The Taiyang River is a river in Hainan Island, China. It rises in Hongding Mountain of southeastern Qiongzhong County and flows eastward across the Wanning City to empty into the South China Sea. The river has a length of 75.7 km and drains an area of 592.51 square km.

References

Rivers of Hainan